Journal of Reproductive and Infant Psychology is a peer-reviewed medical journal covering psychology as it relates to human reproduction and infancy. It was established in 1983 and is published five times per year by Taylor & Francis on behalf of the Society for Reproductive and Infant Psychology, of which it is the official journal. The editor-in-chief is Fiona Alderdice (University of Oxford and Queen's University Belfast). According to the Journal Citation Reports, the journal has a 2020 impact factor of 2.481.

References

External links

Obstetrics and gynaecology journals
Psychology journals
Pediatrics journals
Taylor & Francis academic journals
Publications established in 1983
English-language journals
Reproductive health journals